Syssphinx hubbardi, or Hubbard's silk moth, is a species of moth in the family Saturniidae. It is found in Mexico and the southern United States.

Distribution
The species can be found in Texas, Arizona, New Mexico, and California. It is also found in the Sonoran Desert in Mexico.

Ecology
The caterpillar is approximately 2.5 inches long, and green with many white dots. It also has a violet line that runs across its body. They commonly feed on Prosopis (mesquite), Acacia, and Cercidium microphyllum (palo verde).

References

Moths described in 1902
Saturniidae